Palacios may refer to:

 Palacios (surname)
 Palacios, Texas
 Los Palacios, Cuba

See also
 Palacio, a surname